Sandringham High School is a South African high school in Sandringham, a north-eastern suburb of Johannesburg. The school opened in 1967 and teaches grades 8 to 12.

References

Schools in Johannesburg
Educational institutions established in 1967
1967 establishments in South Africa